Warham Camp is an Iron Age circular hill fort with a diameter of  near Warham, south of Wells-next-the-Sea in Norfolk. It is a Scheduled Monument and a  biological Site of Special Scientific Interest. It is in the Norfolk Coast Area of Outstanding Natural Beauty.

The fort is divided into two parts by a channel of the River Stiffkey constructed in the eighteenth century. It dates to the last few centuries before the Roman invasion of Britain, with evidence of post-occupation activity. The University of East Anglia has described it as the best-preserved hill fort in Norfolk.

This unimproved chalk grassland site is heavily grazed by rabbits and cattle. It has diverse herb species such as common rock-rose and squinancywort, and butterflies including the chalkhill blue.

There is access to the site by a footpath.

References

External links
Warham Camp Iron Age Fort, Norfolk Historic Environment Service

Sites of Special Scientific Interest in Norfolk
Hill forts in Norfolk
Archaeology of Norfolk
Warham, Norfolk